Roy Porter (1946–2002) was a British historian of medicine and psychiatry.

Roy Porter may also refer to:

 Roy Porter (drummer) (1923–1998), American jazz drummer
 Roy Porter (footballer) (1917–1998), Australian rules footballer

See also
 Ron Porter (born 1945), American football player
 Ray Porter, American actor